The Hunchback of Notre Dame is a 1996 American animated musical drama film produced by Walt Disney Feature Animation and released by Walt Disney Pictures. The 34th Disney animated feature film and the seventh produced during the Disney Renaissance, it is loosely based on the 1831 novel of the same name by Victor Hugo. The film was directed by Gary Trousdale and Kirk Wise and produced by Don Hahn, from a screenplay written by Tab Murphy, Irene Mecchi, Jonathan Roberts, and the writing team of Bob Tzudiker and Noni White. Featuring the voices of Tom Hulce, Demi Moore, Tony Jay, and Kevin Kline, the film follows Quasimodo, the deformed and confined bell-ringer of Notre Dame, and his yearning to explore the outside world and be accepted by society, against the wishes of his cruel, puritanical foster father Claude Frollo, who also wants to exterminate Paris' Romani population.

The film is considered to be one of Disney's darkest animated films due to its mature subject matter such as infanticide, lust, damnation, antiziganism, genocide, and sin, despite the changes made from the original source material in order to ensure a G rating from the MPAA. The musical score was written by Alan Menken, with songs written by Menken and lyricist Stephen Schwartz, who had previously collaborated on Pocahontas (1995). The pair later also collaborated on 2007's Enchanted.

The Hunchback of Notre Dame was released on June 21, 1996, to generally positive reviews. It was a commercial success, grossing over $325 million worldwide and becoming the fifth highest-grossing film of 1996. The film received Academy Award and Golden Globe Award nominations for its musical score. A stage adaptation of the film was produced by Walt Disney Theatrical in 1999. A direct-to-video sequel, The Hunchback of Notre Dame II, was released in 2002.

Plot 

The story is narrated by Clopin, a Romani puppeteer, to a group of children.

A group of Roma immigrating to Paris are ambushed by Judge Claude Frollo, Paris' Minister of Justice, and his soldiers. One woman attempts to flee with her baby, reaching the doors of Notre Dame pleading for sanctuary. Frollo chases her down and knocks her onto the cathedral's steps, where she fractures her skull and dies. Seeing her baby's appearance, Frollo believes it to be a demon and tries to drown the child but is interrupted by the archdeacon, who scolds Frollo for murdering an innocent woman. Afraid for his soul, Frollo reluctantly agrees to raise the child as his own, naming him "Quasimodo" (meaning 'half-formed') and hiding him away in the cathedral's bell tower.

Twenty years later, Quasimodo has grown into a kind yet isolated young man, now with a pronounced hunchback caused by kyphosis. He has lived his entire life in the cathedral with his only company being a trio of living stone gargoyles Victor, Hugo, and Laverne. The gargoyles encourage him to attend the annual Festival of Fools, despite Frollo's warnings that he would be shunned for his appearance. Quasimodo attends and is celebrated for his appearance but then, prompted by Frollo's guards, is humiliated by the crowd. Frollo refuses Quasimodo's pleas for help, but he is rescued by Esmeralda, a kind Traveller. Frollo, who intends to commit genocide against Romani people living in Paris, orders her arrest but Esmeralda escapes using a magic trick.

Quasimodo retreats back into the cathedral, followed by Esmeralda and Captain Phoebus of Frollo's guard. Phoebus refuses to arrest her for witchcraft inside Notre Dame and instead tells Frollo that she has claimed asylum. Esmeralda finds and befriends Quasimodo, who helps her escape Notre Dame out of gratitude for defending him. She entrusts Quasimodo with a pendant containing a map to the Roma hideout called the Court of Miracles. Frollo develops an obsessive lust for Esmeralda and, upon realizing this, begs the Virgin Mary to save him from her "spell" and avoid eternal damnation.

When Frollo discovers that Esmeralda escaped, he searches for her, bribing and arresting Travellers and setting fire to houses while trying to find her. Phoebus defies Frollo when ordered to burn down a house with a family inside and Frollo orders him executed. Phoebus flees but is struck by an arrow and falls into the River Seine, where he is found by Esmeralda and taken to Notre Dame for refuge. The gargoyles encourage Quasimodo to confess his feelings for Esmeralda, but he is heartbroken to discover she and Phoebus have fallen in love. Realizing that Quasimodo helped Esmeralda escape, Frollo tells him he knows about the Court of Miracles and plans to attack it at dawn. Using the map Esmeralda gave him, Quasimodo and Phoebus find the court to warn the Roma, only for Frollo to follow them and capture all the Travellers present.

When Esmeralda again rejects Frollo's advances, he attempts to burn her at the stake at Place du Parvis, but Quasimodo swoops down and carries her to the cathedral tower, crying "Sanctuary!" from the ledge. When Frollo attempts to seize the cathedral, Phoebus releases the Roma and rallies the Paris citizens against Frollo's guards. Quasimodo and the gargoyles pour molten lead onto the streets to prevent anyone entering, but Frollo himself manages to break into the cathedral beforehand. Violating the tradition of sanctuary, he pursues Quasimodo and Esmeralda to the bell tower with the intent of killing them both. He and Quasimodo fight, eventually both falling from a ledge. Frollo plummets to his death in the molten lead while Quasimodo is saved by Phoebus. Quasimodo accepts Phoebus and Esmeralda's love and they encourage him to leave the cathedral; when he does so, the people of Paris hail him as a hero.

Voice cast 
 Tom Hulce as Quasimodo
 Demi Moore as Esmeralda (singing voice by Heidi Mollenhauer)
 Tony Jay as Judge Claude Frollo
 Kevin Kline as Captain Phoebus 
 Paul Kandel as Clopin Trouillefou
 Jason Alexander, Charles Kimbrough, and Mary Wickes as Hugo, Victor, and Laverne respectively. This was Wickes' final acting performance as she died a year before its release, at age 85. Jane Withers provided Laverne's remaining dialogue for the film.
 David Ogden Stiers as the Archdeacon

Production

Development 
The idea to adapt The Hunchback of Notre Dame came from development executive David Stainton in 1993, who was inspired to turn Victor Hugo's novel The Hunchback of Notre-Dame into an animated feature film after reading the Classics Illustrated comic book adaptation. Stainton then proposed the idea to then-studio chairman Jeffrey Katzenberg. After the release of Beauty and the Beast (1991), Gary Trousdale had taken a sabbatical break from directing, instead spending several months developing storyboards for The Lion King (1994). Following this, Trousdale and Kirk Wise subsequently developed an animated feature based on the Greek myth of Orpheus and Eurydice titled A Song of the Sea, adapting it to make the central character a humpback whale and setting it in the open ocean. While they were working on the project they were summoned to meet with Katzenberg. "During that time," explained Trousdale, "while we working on it, we got a call from Jeffrey. He said, 'Guys, drop everything – you're working on Hunchback now. According to Wise, they believed that it had "a great deal of potential... great memorable characters, a really terrific setting, the potential for fantastic visuals, and a lot of emotion."

Production on The Hunchback of Notre Dame began in the summer of 1993. In October 1993, directors Gary Trousdale and Kirk Wise, art director David Goetz, Roy Conli, Ed Ghertner, Will Finn, Alan Menken, and Stephen Schwartz took a trip to Paris, France, for ten days; three days were devoted to exploring Notre Dame including a private tour of rarely glimpsed sites such as passageways, stairwells, towers, and a hidden room. The production crew also visited the Palace of Justice and an original location of the Court of Miracles.

Writing 

Writer Tab Murphy was brought on board to write the screenplay, and it was decided early on that Quasimodo would be the center of the story, as he was in preceding live-action film adaptations. In the early drafts, Quasimodo served as a Cyrano between Phoebus and Esmeralda, but it was discarded to focus more on Quasimodo. Meanwhile, a love story between Quasimodo and Esmeralda was also conceived, according to Murphy, but "we decided to make Phoebus more heroic and central to the story. Out of that decision grew the idea of some sort of a triangle between Quasimodo, Esmeralda and Phoebus." Some of the novel's key characters were jettisoned entirely. The gargoyles of Notre Dame were added to the story by Trousdale and Wise. Their portrayal as comedic friends and confidantes of Quasimodo was inspired by a portion of the novel, which reads: "The other statues, the ones of monsters and demons, felt no hatred for Quasimodo…The saints were his friends and blessed him; the monsters were his friends, and protected him. Thus he would pour out his heart at length to them."

One of the first changes made to accommodate Disney's request was to turn the villainous Claude Frollo into a judge rather than an archdeacon, thus avoiding religious sensibilities in the finished film. "As we were exploring the characters, especially Frollo, we certainly found a lot of historical parallels to the type of mania he had: the Confederate South, Nazi Germany, take your pick," explained Wise. "Those things influenced our thinking." Producer Don Hahn evaluated that one inspiration for Frollo was found in Ralph Fiennes's performance as Amon Goeth in Schindler's List (1993), who had murdered Jews yet lusted after his Jewish maid.

For the opening sequence, Disney story veteran Burny Mattinson constructed an effective sequence that covered much exposition, although Katzenberg felt something was missing. Following Stephen Schwartz's suggestion to musicalize the sequence, French animators Paul and Gaëtan Brizzi storyboarded the sequence to Menken and Schwartz's music resulting in "The Bells of Notre Dame." Lyricist Stephen Schwartz also worked closely with the writing team even suggesting that the audience should be left wondering what the outcome of what Phoebus would do before he extinguishes the torch in water in retaliation against Frollo. Another was the film's conclusion. While Frollo's death was made more explicit, Quasimodo and Esmeralda were both spared their fates and given a happy ending. This revised ending was based in part on Victor Hugo's own libretto to a Hunchback opera, in which he had permitted Captain Phoebus to save Esmeralda from her execution.

Casting 
In late 1993, pop singer Cyndi Lauper was the first actor cast during the film's initial stages. She had been hired one week after reading for a part with the directors, who felt her performance was "hilarious and sweet". Thinking she had been cast as Esmeralda, Lauper was startled to learn she was to voice a gargoyle named Quinn. The development team had came up with the names of Chaney, Laughton and Quinn—named after the actors who portrayed Quasimodo in preceding Hunchback film adaptations. However, Disney's legal department objected to the proposed names of the gargoyles, fearing that the estates of Lon Chaney, Charles Laughton, or Anthony Quinn (who was still alive at the time) would file a lawsuit over the unauthorized use of their names, so the idea was dropped. Trousdale and Wise then suggested naming the characters Lon, Charles, and Anthony, which would have resulted in the same legal concern. Instead, they would name the first two gargoyles after Victor Hugo, and the third gargoyle after Andrews Sisters singer Laverne Andrews as suggested by Wise.

Now cast as Laverne, Lauper was deemed too youthful for a friend who would provide wise counsel to Quasimodo. At the same time, Sam McMurray—best known for his work on The Tracey Ullman Show—was hired for Hugo. Meanwhile, Charles Kimbrough was cast as Victor, who was initially unimpressed at an animated adaptation of Hunchback, but later became rather impressed at the level of research that went into the film and how the story ideas transitioned from the novel to the screen. After several recording sessions and test screenings, Lauper and McMurray were called by the directors who released them from their roles. At one point, Jeffrey Katzenberg had considered Arsenio Hall, David Letterman, and Jay Leno to voice the gargoyles, but he eventually cast Jason Alexander, due to his previous role in The Return of Jafar (1994). After a suggestion by supervising animator Will Finn, Laverne was then re-envisioned into a wiser, mature character with Mary Wickes cast in the role. Following Wickes' death in October 1995, Jane Withers was hired to voice her six remaining lines.

Katzenberg had also wanted Meat Loaf for the role of Quasimodo, but he passed on the role after Disney could not come to an agreement with his record company. Mandy Patinkin was also approached for the title role, but his style of portraying Quasimodo collided with the producers' demands, and Patinkin stated, I [was] just there at the audition [and I] said, 'I can't do this. Tom Hulce was cast as Quasimodo following his first audition for the role, and according to the actor, he noticed during the audition that the Disney executives, producers, and directors "were staring at the floor. It looked like everyone was at a memorial service" until he noticed the floor was lined with storyboard sketches. According to Wise, the filmmakers "like to audition the voices with our eyes closed, so we see the character's face." Quasimodo was originally portrayed as older and with more of a speech impediment during the early rehearsals, but Hulce commented that "we experimented, endlessly. At one point I was ready to call in and say 'Things just aren't happening'." Ultimately, the directors desired to portray Quasimodo with a younger voice different from the previous portrayals since "[Victor] Hugo described Quasimodo as 20." Additionally, Hulce was permitted to do his own singing after performing a demo recording of "Out There."

Due to her deeper voice than actresses who had previously played Disney heroines, Demi Moore was cast as Esmeralda, and met with Alan Menken and Stephen Schwartz on singing. After several singing demos, the actress said, "You'd better get someone else," according to Schwartz. New York City cabaret singer Heidi Mollenhauer was selected to provide the singing voice. For the role of Phoebus, co-director Kirk Wise explained that "As we're designing the characters, we form a short list of names...to help us find the personality of the character." Subsequently, the filmmakers modeled his portrayal on the personalities of Errol Flynn and John Wayne, and "One of the names on the top of the list all the time was Kevin Kline." Moore and Kline were the only actors to have the role directly offered to them instead of auditioning. British actor Tony Jay, who declared his role as Frollo as his "bid for immortality," was cast after the directors had worked with him in Beauty and the Beast (1991). Anthony Hopkins was originally considered for the role, but he turned down the offer. After watching his portrayal as Uncle Ernie in the musical The Who's Tommy, Broadway actor Paul Kandel was selected to voice Clopin.

Animation 
Alongside Pocahontas (1995), storyboard work on The Hunchback of the Notre Dame was among the first to be produced for an animated film on the new Disney Feature Animation building adjacent to the main Disney lot in Burbank, which was dedicated in 1995. However, most animators were occupied with The Lion King (1994) and Pocahontas (1995) at the time, and as a result, more animators were hired from Canada and United Kingdom to join the production team for the film. As the development phase furthered along, most of the entire animation team moved out into a large warehouse facility on Airway in Glendale, California. As the Disney story artists, layout crew, and animators moved in their new quarters, they decided to name the building "Sanctuary."

Since Who Framed Roger Rabbit (1988), other animators hired by Disney Feature Animation were from Germany, France, Ireland, and additional ones from Canada were involved in providing animation duties at the recently opened satellite studio, Walt Disney Animation Paris, of which about 20 percent of the film was done. Meanwhile, at the Feature Animation Florida studio, which had been working on Mulan (1998), their first in-house production, at least seven animators penned about four minutes of screen time, which mostly involved Frollo and Quasimodo. The studio had also provided additional layout, cleanup, and special-effects animation.

During early development, Trousdale and Wise realized they needed crowds of people, but for this time, they wanted them to move as opposed to being traditionally drawn as painted backdrops. Recalling the wildebeest stampede in The Lion King (1994), they landed on the idea of using computer animation to generate them. For that reason, the CGI department, headed by Kiran Joshi, created the software Crowd to achieve large-scale crowd scenes, particularly for the Feast of Fools sequence and the film's climax. The software was used to create six types of characters—males and females either average in weight, fat, or thin—which were programmed and assigned 72 specific movements ranging from jumping and clapping. Digital technology also provided a visual sweep that freed Quasimodo to scamper around the cathedral and soar around the plaza to rescue Esmeralda.

Music 

Having worked on Pocahontas (1995) for a year, Alan Menken and Stephen Schwartz were offered multiple film projects to collaborate on when they chose to work on The Hunchback of Notre Dame. According to Schwartz, they had both been attracted to underlying themes of social outcast and Quasimodo's struggle to break free of the psychological abuse of Frollo.

The film has many musical motifs that carry throughout the film, weaving their way in and out of various pieces of music, and having varying timbres depending on the action in the story at that point. The film's soundtrack includes a musical score composed by Menken and songs written by him and Stephen Schwartz. The film's songs include "The Bells of Notre Dame" for Clopin, Frollo and the Archdeacon, "Out There" for Quasimodo and Frollo, "Topsy Turvy" for Clopin, "God Help the Outcasts" for Esmeralda, "Heaven's Light" for Quasimodo, "Hellfire" for the Archdeacon and Frollo, "A Guy Like You" for the gargoyles and "The Court of Miracles" for Clopin and the other Travellers.

Three songs written for the film were discarded for the storyboarding process. Trousdale and Wise were not certain what musical number could be placed for the third act, though Menken and Schwartz conceived two love songs, "In a Place of Miracles" and "As Long as There's a Moon," between Esmeralda and Phoebus in the film. However, Trousdale and Wise felt the song took too much focus off of Quasimodo, and ultimately decided to have Clopin sing about sentencing Phoebus and Quasimodo to death for finding their Romani sanctuary. Menken and Schwartz had also written "Someday" originally for the film, but the directors suggested that a religious song be sung in the cathedral, and the song was instead featured in the end credits. R&B group All-4-One recorded the song for the end credits of the North American English release, and by the British R&B girl group Eternal in the British English version. Luis Miguel recorded the version for the Latin American Spanish version, which became a major hit.

Themes and interpretations 
The Hunchback of Notre Dames thematic concerns include infanticide, lust, damnation, and sin, as well as the belief in a loving, forgiving God. According to Mark Pinsky, it is also a "condemnation of abortion, euthanasia, and racism, and [a] moral resistance to genocide."

The Hunchback of Notre Dame was the first – and currently only – Disney animated feature to have a major focus on traditional religious faith; in this case, pre-Reformation Catholicism. In fact, the words "God," "Lord", and "Hell" are uttered more times in this film than in any other produced by Disney. The Gospel According to Disney explains that "it is the church... that interposes, or attempts to interpose itself between the villain and his evil intentions." During production, the studio executives expressed concerns about various aspects of the film, especially those relating to the religious content in the story, "for their failure to defend the poor and the powerless" and concerns that the story was "too controversial." Deconstructing Disney notes that the studio "approached the name of God with an almost Hebraic zeal (that it should never be stated) yet here it is invoked in a manner both pious and puritan." Many of the songs were adapted from genuine Latin prayers and chants, such as "Hellfire", which uses the Tridentine form of the Confiteor as a counterpoint melody. The Gospel According to Disney includes a quote that says "religion... appears as an impotent, irrelevant caricature [and] Disney refuses to admit a serious role for religion." At one point, the archdeacon says to Esmeralda, "You can't right all the wrongs of this world by yourself... perhaps there is someone in here who can," referring either to God or Mary. This questions the power religious people actually have in making the world a moral and happy place, according to Pinsky.

The Gospel According to Disney explains that "while Frollo's stated goal is to purge the world of vice and sin, according to the opening song, he 'saw corruption everywhere except within.'" Because "killing the woman on the steps has put Frollo's soul in mortal danger," he has to take the child and look after him as penance. Even then, he absolves himself of agency in the murder by claiming "God works in mysterious ways," and ponders whether "the child may be of use to him one day." During the song "God Help the Outcasts," Esmeralda wonders if "Were you once an outcast too?" while looking at a statue of Mary with the infant Jesus, referencing the Flight into Egypt.

According to the film's production notes, Quasimodo is "symbolically viewed as being an angel in a devil's body." He is "trapped between heaven above [and] the gritty streets of urban Paris viewed as Hell." The version of the alphabet Quasimodo recites in a daily ritual reflects Frollo's view of the world – full of abominations and blasphemy. He is also constantly called deformed, ugly, a monster, and an outcast who would be hated if he ever left the confines of the church.

Release 
In 1994, the film was scheduled for a Christmas 1995 release, though the film was reportedly delayed following the departure of Katzenberg from The Walt Disney Company. By January 1995, it was later pushed back to a summer 1996 release. The film premiered on June 19, 1996, at the New Orleans Superdome, where it was played on six enormous screens. The premiere was preceded by a parade through the French Quarter, beginning at Jackson Square and utilizing floats and cast members from Walt Disney World. The film was widely released two days later.

Marketing 
As part of the promotion of the film, Walt Disney Records shipped two million products, including sing-along home videos, soundtrack CDs, and the "My First Read Along" novelized version of the film. Upon release, The Hunchback of Notre Dame was accompanied by a marketing campaign of more than $40 million with commercial tie-ins with Burger King, Payless Shoes, Nestlé and Mattel. By 1997, Disney earned approximately $500 million in profit with the spin-off products based from the film.

Home media 
The Hunchback of Notre Dame was first released on VHS, standard CLV LaserDisc, and special edition CAV LaserDisc on March 4, 1997, under the Walt Disney Masterpiece Collection label. By mid-1998, the operating income of the VHS release had accumulated to $200 million. It was originally planned for a DVD release in December 2000 as part of the Walt Disney Gold Classic Collection, but instead, it was re-issued on March 19, 2002, as a special edition along with its direct-to-video sequel, The Hunchback of Notre Dame II (2002).

Walt Disney Studios Home Entertainment released The Hunchback of Notre Dame on Blu-ray alongside its sequel in a Special Edition "2-Movie Collection" on March 12, 2013.

Reception

Box office 
The Hunchback of Notre Dame grossed $21.3 million during its opening weekend, ranking second place at the box office behind Eraser. In a new box office strategy, Disney also included ticket sales which were sold from Disney Stores nationwide, which added about $1 million to the box office numbers. However, the film had earned slightly less when compared to Pocahontas, which had grossed $29 million the year previous. Buena Vista Pictures Distribution president Dick Cook defended the results claiming it was comparable to Beauty and the Beast (1991), which opened in half as many theaters, and grossed about $9 million.

The film ultimately grossed just over $100.1 million domestically. In foreign markets, by December 1996, the film became the fifteenth film that year to gross over $100 million, and went on to accumulate $225.2 million, surpassing Pocahontas $204.5 million international gross. Worldwide, The Hunchback of Notre Dame grossed over $325.3 million, making it the fifth highest-grossing film of 1996.

Critical reception 
The consensus reads, "Disney's take on the Victor Hugo classic is dramatically uneven, but its strong visuals, dark themes, and message of tolerance make for a more-sophisticated-than-average children's film." Metacritic, which assigns a normalized rating out of 100 from top reviews from mainstream critics, calculated a score of 74 based on 28 reviews, indicating "generally favorable reviews." Audiences polled by CinemaScore gave the film an average grade of "A" on an A+ to F scale.

Chicago Sun-Times film critic Roger Ebert rewarded the film 4 stars, calling it "the best Disney animated feature since Beauty and the Beast – a whirling, uplifting, thrilling story with a heart touching message that emerges from the comedy and song." In his review for the Chicago Tribune, Gene Siskel awarded the film  (out of a possible 4) stars, describing the film as "a surprisingly emotional, simplified version of the Victor Hugo novel" with "effective songs and, yes, tasteful bits of humor." Owen Gleiberman of Entertainment Weekly graded the film an A, labeling it as "the best of Disney's 'serious' animated features in the multiplex era, (...) an emotionally rounded fairy tale that balances darkness and sentimentality, pathos and triumph, with uncanny grace."

Richard Corliss of Time magazine praised the film, stating that "the result is a grand cartoon cathedral, teeming with gargoyles and treachery, hopeless love and tortured lust" and also said "Alan Menken and Stephen Schwartz have written the largest, most imposing score yet for an animated film." Charles Spencer of The Daily Telegraph gave it a positive review, saying "it is thrillingly dramatic, and for long stretches you forget you are watching a cartoon at all... A dazzling treat." Variety also gave the film a positive review, stating that "there is much to admire in Hunchback, not least the risk of doing such a downer of a story at all" and also saying: "the new film should further secure Disney's dominance in animation, and connoisseurs of the genre, old and young, will have plenty to savor." Janet Maslin wrote in her The New York Times review: "In a film that bears conspicuous, eager resemblances to other recent Disney hits, the filmmakers' Herculean work is overshadowed by a Sisyphean problem. There's just no way to delight children with a feel-good version of this story."

Upon opening in France in March 1997, reception from French critics towards Hunchback was largely positive. French critics and audiences found resonance in the film which recounted a real-life incident from August 1995 when French police raided a Parisian church and seized over 200 immigrants seeking refuge from deportation under France's strict expulsion laws. "It is difficult not to think of the undocumented immigrants of St. Bernard when Frollo tries to sweep out the rabble," wrote one reviewer.

Audience response 
Arnaud Later, a leading scholar on Hugo, accused Disney of simplifying, editing, and censoring the novel in numerous aspects, including the personalities of the characters. In his review, he later wrote that the animators "don't have enough confidence in their own emotional feeling" and that the film "falls back on clichés." Descendants of Hugo bashed Disney in an open letter to the Libération newspaper for their ancestor receiving no mention on the advertisement posters, and describing the film as a "vulgar commercialization by unscrupulous salesmen."

Some audiences expressed concerns about whether the film was appropriate for children. Jason Alexander said that while "Disney would have us believe this movie's like the Ringling Bros., for children of all ages," he would not take his then-four-year-old child to view the film. However, some newspaper publications reported child audiences being unaffected by the mature content and praising the film. Some audiences criticized the film for having "homosexual undertones," noticeably with the song "Out There," being the name of a gay pressure group and as a call to come out of the closet.

In June 1996, the Southern Baptist Convention voted overwhelmingly to urge its sixteen million members to boycott Disney films, theme parks, and merchandise, saying the company "disparages Christian values." The cause of the protests—unrelated to the film—stemmed from the company's domestic partnership policy and gay and lesbian theme days at Walt Disney World. Trousdale also claimed that Southern Baptists were outraged over the casting of Demi Moore as Esmeralda, as she had just come off of the film Striptease (1996), in which she played an exotic dancer. Disney officials would not comment on the motivation for the religious content displayed in the film beyond comments on the subject included in the film's press kit, with Disney vice president John Dreyer commenting, "The film speaks for itself." Nevertheless, there was praise from religious organizations for its portrayal of religion in the film. Louis P. Sheldon, a Presbyterian pastor and chairman of the Anaheim-based Traditional Values Coalition, said two months before its premiere: "I am thrilled at what I hear about Hunchback, that Disney is seeking to honour Christianity and its role in Western civilization. I only pray that it will accomplish much good in the minds and hearts of its viewers."

Following protests in the United States, thousands of British parents banned their kids from seeing The Hunchback of Notre Dame. In reaction to the controversy, Walt Disney Feature Animation president Peter Schneider said, "The only controversy I've heard about the movie is certain people's opinion that, 'Well, it's OK for me, but it might disturb somebody else." Schneider also stated in his defense that the film was test-screened "all over the country, and I've heard nobody, parents or children, complain about any of the issues. I think, for example, the issue of disabilities is treated with great respect." and "Quasimodo is really the underdog who becomes the hero; I don't think there's anything better for anybody's psychological feelings than to become the hero of a movie. The only thing we've been asked to be careful about is the word hunchback, which we have to use in the title."

Accolades 

The film is recognized by American Film Institute in these lists:
 2006: AFI's Greatest Movie Musicals – Nominated
 2008: AFI's 10 Top 10:
 Nominated Animation Film

Franchising

Stage musical 

The film was adapted into a musical production, re-written and directed by James Lapine and produced by Walt Disney Theatrical, in Berlin, Germany. The musical Der Glöckner von Notre Dame (translated in English as The Bellringer of Notre Dame) was very successful and played from 1999 to 2002, before closing. A cast recording was also recorded in German. An English-language revival of the musical premiered in San Diego on October 28, 2014.

Sequel and spin-offs 
In June 1998, Disney had announced production had begun on a sequel titled The Hunchback of Notre Dame Deux: The Secret of the Bells, and was slated for release in fall 1999. However, the sequel was delayed from its planned fall release in order to accommodate the recording of "I'm Gonna Love You" by Jennifer Love Hewitt. The sequel reunited its original voice cast, with Hewitt, Haley Joel Osment and Michael McKean voicing new characters. In 2002, the direct-to-video sequel, The Hunchback of Notre Dame II, was released on VHS and DVD.

Quasimodo, Esmeralda, Victor, Hugo, Laverne and Frollo all made guest appearances on the Disney Channel TV series House of Mouse. Frollo could also be seen amongst a crowd of Disney Villains in Mickey's House of Villains.

Live-action remake 
A live-action remake of The Hunchback of Notre Dame was announced in January 2019. The script will be penned by David Henry Hwang with Menken and Schwartz returning to write the music. Josh Gad, David Hoberman and Todd Lieberman are set to produce, with Gad being possibly considered to play Quasimodo. The film, titled Hunchback, will draw elements from both the animated film and Hugo's novel. In January 2021, Gad stated that the project is still in the works and that he and the studio are "getting closer" to making it happen.

Video games 
In 1996, a tie-in game entitled The Hunchback of Notre Dame: Topsy Turvy Games was released by Disney Interactive for the PC and the Nintendo Game Boy, which is a collection of mini games based around the Festival of Fools that includes a variation of Balloon Fight.

A world based on the movie, "La Cité des Cloches" (The City of Bells), made its debut appearance in the Kingdom Hearts series in Kingdom Hearts 3D: Dream Drop Distance. It was the first new Disney world confirmed for the game.

In 2022, Hunchback content was made available for a limited time within the Disney Magic Kingdoms game by Gameloft.

Other media 
Disney has converted its adaptation of The Hunchback of Notre Dame into other media. For example, Disney Comic Hits #11, published by Marvel Comics, features two stories based upon the film. Characters from The Hunchback of Notre Dame make very rare appearances at the Disney Parks and Resorts, but can be seen as figures inside Clopin's Music Box in Fantasyland.

References

Bibliography

External links 

 
 
 
 
 
 The Hunchback of Notre Dame: Comically Framing Virtue and Vice, chapter four in Mouse Morality: The Rhetoric of Disney Animated Film
 

1996 animated films
1996 films
1990s American animated films
1996 comedy-drama films
1990s musical films
1990s English-language films
American children's animated musical films
American comedy-drama films
American musical comedy films
American musical drama films
Animated buddy films
Animated drama films
Animated films based on novels
Disney Renaissance
Films about prejudice
Films based on The Hunchback of Notre-Dame
Films directed by Gary Trousdale
Films directed by Kirk Wise
Films produced by Don Hahn
Films scored by Alan Menken
Films set in the 1480s
Animated films set in France
Animated films set in Paris
Films set in religious buildings and structures
The Hunchback of Notre Dame (franchise)
Walt Disney Animation Studios films
Walt Disney Pictures animated films
Gargoyles in popular culture
Films about Romani people
1990s children's animated films
Films adapted into comics
Films with screenplays by Irene Mecchi
Films with screenplays by Jonathan Roberts (writer)
Films with screenplays by Noni White
Films with screenplays by Tab Murphy
Films with screenplays by Bob Tzudiker
Films set in the Middle Ages
Disney controversies
Films with screenplays by Sue C. Nichols
Films about disability
Films with screenplays by Burny Mattinson